Ladd's Castle, also known as Candor Hall, is a historic house located at 1337 Lafayette Avenue in the Colonial Manor section of West Deptford Township in Gloucester County, New Jersey. It was added to the National Register of Historic Places on October 31, 1972, for its significance in architecture and urban planning.

History and description
The house was constructed , by John Ladd, a surveyor who purportedly helped William Penn in planning the organization of Philadelphia. The two-story patterned brick house features Flemish bond with glazed headers. According the nomination form, it is the oldest brick house in the county. The house was renovated 1947–1948.

See also
National Register of Historic Places listings in Gloucester County, New Jersey
List of the oldest buildings in New Jersey

References

External links
 

West Deptford Township, New Jersey
Brick buildings and structures
1688 establishments in New Jersey
Houses completed in 1688
Houses on the National Register of Historic Places in New Jersey
Houses in Gloucester County, New Jersey
National Register of Historic Places in Gloucester County, New Jersey
New Jersey Register of Historic Places